Constantia elegans is a species of sea snails in the family Vanikoridae. It is the type species of its genus. It is found in Japan.

References 

Vanikoridae
Gastropods described in 1860
Molluscs of Japan